Tighen-e Olya (also Romanized as Tīghen-e ‘Olyā) is a village in Meydavud Rural District, Meydavud District, Bagh-e Malek County, Khuzestan Province, Iran. At the 2006 census, its population was 563, in 110 families.

References 

Populated places in Bagh-e Malek County